"Enough to Get Away" is the first single from Joseph Arthur's 2006 album Nuclear Daydream. In the US, the album was released on September 19, 2006. In the UK, both Nuclear Daydream and the follow-up album Let's Just Be were released on September 3, 2007. The AA-side "Diamond Ring" is the album version, taken from Let's Just Be. The album version of "Enough to Get Away" also appeared as a B-side to Joseph's 2007 single "Honey and the Moon." The 7" single is pressed on light cream-colored vinyl and is limited edition numbered.

Joseph discussed "Enough to Get Away" in an interview with Newsday:

Track listing
7" vinyl (JA07V):
 "Enough to Get Away" – 2:47
 "Diamond Ring" – 3:26

Notes
 "Enough to Get Away" written and produced by Joseph Arthur.
 "Diamond Ring" written by Joseph Arthur and Kraig Jarret Johnson. Produced by Joseph Arthur and The Lonely Astronauts.

References

Joseph Arthur songs
2007 singles
Songs written by Joseph Arthur
2006 songs
14th Floor Records singles